Daria Chikunova (born 12 April 1999) is a Russian swimmer. She competed in the women's 100 metre breaststroke event at the 2016 Summer Olympics.

References

External links
 

1999 births
Living people
Russian female breaststroke swimmers
Olympic swimmers of Russia
Swimmers at the 2015 European Games
Swimmers at the 2016 Summer Olympics
Place of birth missing (living people)
European Games medalists in swimming
European Games gold medalists for Russia
European Games bronze medalists for Russia